The Zaate Herremenie (Limburgish (Maastrichtian variant) for: drunken orchestra) is a carnival that takes place in the city of Maastricht in the Netherlands.

Modern history 

In 1958, Dr John Hoenen introduced  a group musicians to the parade, and a tradition of pushing a pram filled with beer. In 1959, this group was named "Zaate Herremenie" by the citizens of Maastricht. In the early 1960s the name was altered to "De Zaate Herremenie 1959".

References

External links 
 De Zaate Herremenie 1959

Culture in Maastricht